Santiago Martínez (born 7 December 1912, date of death unknown) was a Spanish equestrian. He competed in two events at the 1948 Summer Olympics.

References

1912 births
Year of death missing
Spanish male equestrians
Olympic equestrians of Spain
Equestrians at the 1948 Summer Olympics
Place of birth missing